Lethal Passage: The Story of a Gun is a 1995 non-fiction book by American author Erik Larson. Through the lens of a 1988 school shooting in Virginia Beach, the author explores America's gun culture and the ease in acquiring such weapons as the one used by the school shooter, the MAC-11.

References

1995 non-fiction books
Firearm books